The Sefid-Rud (Espī bīeh) (also known as Sepid-Rud) is a river approximately  long, rising in the Alborz mountain range of northwestern Iran and flowing generally northeast to enter the Caspian Sea at Rasht. The river is Iran's second longest river after the Karun.

Names
Other names and transcriptions include Sepīd-Rūd, Sefidrud, Sefidrood, Sepidrood, and Sepidrud. Above Manjil, "Long Red River".

The river is identified with the Amardus or Mardus (Μάρδος) river of antiquity.

The river is historically famous for the quantity of its fish, especially the Caspian trout, Salmo trutta caspius.

Geography
The Sefid-Rud has cut a water gap through the Alborz mountain range, the Manjil gap, capturing its two headwater tributaries, the Qizil Üzan and Shahrood rivers. It then widens the valley between the Talesh Hills and the main Alborz range. The gap provides a major route between Tehran and Gīlān Province with its Caspian lowlands.

In the wide valley before the Sefid-Rud enters the Caspian Sea a number of transportation and irrigation canals have been cut; the two biggest are the Khomam and the Now.

Dam and reservoir
The Sefid-Rud was dammed in 1962 by the Shahbanu Farah Dam (later renamed Manjil Dam),  which created a  reservoir and allowed the irrigation of an additional . The  reservoir mediates some flooding and significantly increased rice production in the Sefid Rud Delta. The hydroelectric component of the dam generates 87,000 kilowatts. The completion of the dam had a negative impact on the river's fisheries, through reduced stream flow (due to diversion), increased water temperature, and decreased food availability, especially for sturgeon but also for the Caspian trout.

History

The river was known in antiquity by the names Mardos and Amardos. In the Hellenistic period the north side of the Sefid (then Mardus) was occupied by the mountain tribe the Cadusii.

David Rohl identifies the Sefid-Rud with the Biblical Pishon river.

Gallery

Notes

External links
 "Sefid Rood Watershed" Economic potentials of Kurdistan Province in the fields of Water, Agriculture and Natural Resources Ministry of Interior, Islamic Republic of Iran

Rivers of Gilan Province
Alborz (mountain range)
Tributaries of the Caspian Sea
Landforms of Kurdistan Province
Landforms of East Azerbaijan Province
Landforms of Ardabil Province
Landforms of Zanjan Province
Landforms of Qazvin Province
Landforms of Tehran Province
Landforms of Gilan Province